In organic chemistry, a dicarbonate, also known as a pyrocarbonate, is a compound containing the divalent [−O−(C=O)−O−(C=O)−O−] or −− functional group, which consists of two carbonate groups sharing an oxygen atom.  These compounds can be viewed as double esters of a hypothetical dicarbonic acid,  or HO−(C=O)−O−(C=O)−OH.  Two important examples are dimethyl dicarbonate H3C−C2O5−CH3 and di-tert-butyl dicarbonate (H3C−)3C−C2O5−C(−CH3)3.

It is one of the oxocarbon anions, consisting solely of oxygen and carbon. Dicarbonate salts are apparently unstable at ambient conditions, but can be made under pressure and may have a fleeting existence in carbonate solutions.

The term "dicarbonate" is sometimes used erroneously to refer to bicarbonate, the common name of the hydrogencarbonate anion  or organic group the ROCO2H.

Inorganic salts
PbC2O5 can be formed at 30 GPa and 2000K from PbCO3 and CO2. It forms white monoclinic crystals, with space group P21/c and four formula units per unit cell. At 30 GPa the unit cell has a=4.771 b=8.079 c=7.070 Å and β=91.32°. The unit cell volume is 272.4 Å3 and density 7.59.

SrC2O5 is very similar to the lead compound, and also has monoclinic structure with  space group P21/c and four formula units per unit cell. At 30 GPa the unit cell has a=4.736 b=8.175 c=7.140 Å and β=91.34°. The unit cell volume is 276.3 Å3 and density 4.61. The double Sr=O bonds have lengths of 1.22, 1.24, and 1.25 Å. The single Sr-O bonds have lengths of 1.36 and 1.41 Å. The angles subtended at the carbon atoms are slightly less than 120°, and the angle at the C-O-C is larger.

See also
Oxalate
Peroxodicarbonate
Pyrophosphate
Pyrosulfate
Tricarbonate

References

Oxyanions
Carbonate esters
Functional groups
Dicarbonates